Biological Chemistry is a peer-reviewed scientific journal focusing on biological chemistry. The journal is published by Walter de Gruyter and the current editor-in-chief is Bernhard Brüne.

History 
The journal was established by Felix Hoppe-Seyler in 1877, under the name Zeitschrift für Physiologische Chemie (English: Journal of Physiological Chemistry), and was edited by him until his death in 1895. The journal was subsequently renamed  Hoppe-Seyler's Zeitschrift für Physiologische Chemie in 1896. Following Hoppe-Seyler, the journal was edited by his student and collaborator, the German biochemist and Nobel laureate Albrecht Kossel, until his death in 1927.  In 1985 the journal was renamed as Biological Chemistry Hoppe-Seyler, before obtaining its current title in 1996.

Abstracting and indexing 
Biological Chemistry is abstracted and indexed in:

According to the Journal Citation Reports, the journal has a 2014 impact factor of 3.268, ranking it 106th out of 289 journals in the category "Biochemistry & Molecular Biology".

References

External links
 

Publications established in 1877
De Gruyter academic journals
Biochemistry journals
English-language journals
Monthly journals
1877 establishments in Germany